Below are some of the minor-league baseball players in the New York Mets organization.

Players

Matthew Allan

Matthew Bruce Allan (born April 17, 2001) is an American professional baseball pitcher in the New York Mets organization.

Allan attended Seminole High School in Sanford, Florida. During his senior year, he threw a perfect game in which he struck out 17 batters. He was named the 2019 Florida High School Player of the Year by Perfect Game. Allan committed to play college baseball at the University of Florida.

Allan was drafted by the New York Mets in the third round with the 89th overall selection in the 2019 Major League Baseball draft. He was considered a top prospect for the draft, but fell due to his strong commitment to Florida. He signed for $2.5 million, the richest deal ever for a third round selection. He made his professional debut with the Rookie-level Gulf Coast League Mets before being promoted to the Brooklyn Cyclones of the Class A Short Season New York–Penn League. Over  innings between both teams, he went 1-0 with a 2.61 ERA and 14 strikeouts. He did not play a minor league game in 2020 due to the cancellation of the minor league season caused by the COVID-19 pandemic.

On May 7, 2021, it was announced that Allan would require Tommy John surgery, causing him to miss the 2021 season. He underwent a cleanup procedure in January 2022, and missed the 2022 season as well.

On February 4, 2023, it was announced that Allan had undergone UCL revision surgery in January, and would likely miss the 2023 season, his fourth consecutive season with no game action.

Tony Dibrell

Michael Anthony Dibrell (born November 8, 1995) is an American professional baseball pitcher in the New York Mets organization.

Dibrell attended Chattahoochee High School in Johns Creek, Georgia, where he played four years of varsity baseball. Undrafted out of high school in the 2014 Major League Baseball draft, he enrolled at Kennesaw State University where he played college baseball.

In 2015, his freshman year at Kennesaw State, Dibrell pitched 16 innings, compiling a 5.06 ERA. After the season, he played in the New England Collegiate Baseball League for the Ocean State Waves. As a sophomore at Kennesaw State in 2016, he made 14 appearances (seven starts) in which he went 1-4 with a 4.64 ERA, striking out 66 batters over 54 innings. That summer, he played in the Cape Cod Baseball League with both the Chatham Anglers and Bourne Braves, earning All-Star honors. In 2017, his junior year, he started 14 games and pitched to a 7-4 record with a 2.45 ERA and 103 strikeouts over  innings. After the season, he was drafted by the New York Mets in the fourth round of the 2017 Major League Baseball draft.

Dibrell signed with the Mets and made his professional debut with the Brooklyn Cyclones of the Class A Short Season New York–Penn League. Over  innings, he struck out 28 batters while pitching to a 5.03 ERA. In 2018, he pitched with the Columbia Fireflies of the Class A South Atlantic League where he went 7-6 with a 3.50 ERA in 23 starts, striking out 147 batters over 131 innings. Dibrell began the 2019 season with the St. Lucie Mets of the Class A-Advanced Florida State League, with whom he was named a FSL All-Star. After pitching to an 8-4 record with a 2.39 ERA over 17 games (16 starts), he was promoted to the Binghamton Rumble Ponies of the Class AA Eastern League in July, with whom he finished the year. Over nine games (eight starts) with Binghamton, Dibrell went 0-8 with a 9.31 ERA.

Dibrell did not play a minor league game in 2020 due to the cancellation of the minor league season caused by the COVID-19 pandemic. He returned to Binghamton to begin 2021, but was placed on the injured list in mid-June and then underwent Tommy John Surgery missing the remainder of the season. Dibrell returned to play in 2022, rehabbing with the Rookie-level Florida Complex League Mets and St. Lucie, with whom he pitched  scoreless innings, before being assigned to Binghamton. Over  innings with Binghamton, he went 2-2 with a 4.55 ERA and 39 strikeouts.

Mateo Gil
Mateo Elijah Gil (born July 24, 2000) is an American professional baseball shortstop in the New York Mets organization.

Gil was born in Newport Beach, California, while his father, Benji Gil, was playing for the Anaheim Angels. He attended Timber Creek High School in Fort Worth, Texas. As a senior in 2018, he batted .389 with six home runs, 43 RBIs, and six triples over 37 games while also compiling a 1.05 ERA. After the season, he was selected by the St. Louis Cardinals in the third round (95th overall) of the 2018 Major League Baseball draft. Gil signed with the Cardinals, forgoing his college commitment to Texas Christian University.

Gil made his professional debut that summer with the Rookie-level Gulf Coast League Cardinals, batting .251 with one home run and twenty RBIs over 45 games. In 2019, he played with the Johnson City Cardinals of the Rookie-level Appalachian League and slashed .270/.324/.431 with seven home runs and 30 RBIs over 51 games. He also played in two games for the Palm Beach Cardinals of the Class A-Advanced Florida State League. That offseason, he played in the Mexican Pacific League (MPL). He did not play a minor league game in 2020 since the season was cancelled due to the COVID-19 pandemic. Gil, however, did return to the MPL that winter for the 2020–2021 season, playing with the Tomateros de Culiacan.

On February 1, 2021, Gil (alongside Austin Gomber, Elehuris Montero, Tony Locey, & Jake Sommers) was traded to the Colorado Rockies in the exchange for Nolan Arenado and $50 million. He was assigned to the Fresno Grizzlies of the Low-A West for the 2021 season, slashing .249/.294/.396 with nine home runs and 56 RBIs over 94 games. Gil opened the 2022 season in extended spring training before he was assigned to the Spokane Indians of the High-A Northwest League in mid-May. Over 48 games with Spokane, he batted .247 with six home runs and 26 RBIs.

After the 2022 season, the New York Mets selected him in the minor league phase of the Rule 5 draft.

Ryley Gilliam

Ryley Carswell Gilliam (born August 11, 1996) is an American professional baseball pitcher in the New York Mets organization.

Gilliam attended Kennesaw Mountain High School in Kennesaw, Georgia, and played college baseball at Clemson University. In 2017, he played for the United States collegiate national team, and also briefly played collegiate summer baseball with the Hyannis Harbor Hawks of the Cape Cod Baseball League.

Gilliam was drafted by the New York Mets in the fifth round of the 2018 Major League Baseball draft. He made his professional debut with the Brooklyn Cyclones, going 0-1 with a 2.08 ERA in 17 relief appearances. He started 2019 with the St. Lucie Mets and was promoted to the Binghamton Rumble Ponies in April before being promoted to the Syracuse Mets in June. Over  relief innings pitched between the three clubs, he compiled a 5-0 record with a 6.05 ERA, striking out 56 while walking 18. He was selected to play in the Arizona Fall League for the Scottsdale Scorpions following the 2019 season.

Gilliam did not play a minor league game in 2020 due to the cancellation of the minor league season caused by the COVID-19 pandemic. He returned to Binghamton for the 2021 season, going 2-4 with a 9.88 ERA over  innings.

On April 1, 2022, it was announced that Gilliam would undergo Tommy John surgery and miss the 2021 season as a result.

Dominic Hamel

Dominic Avery Hamel (born March 2, 1999) is an American professional baseball pitcher in the New York Mets organization.

Hamel attended Hamilton High School in Chandler, Arizona and played college baseball at Yavapai College and Dallas Baptist University. He was drafted by the New York Mets in the third round of the 2021 Major League Baseball draft.

Hamel made his professional debut with the Florida Complex League Mets. He started 2022 with the St. Lucie Mets before being promoted to the Brooklyn Cyclones.

Nick Meyer

Nicholas Meyer (born February 18, 1997) is an American professional baseball catcher in the New York Mets organization.

Meyer attended Santa Margarita Catholic High School and played college baseball at Cal Poly. After his junior year, he was selected by the New York Mets in the sixth round of the 2018 Major League Baseball draft.

Meyer signed with the Mets and made his professional debut with the Brooklyn Cyclones, batting .226 over 43 games. In 2019, he played with the St. Lucie Mets and hit .182 over 64 games. He did not play a game in 2020 due to the cancellation of the minor league season. He split the 2021 season between the Binghamton Rumble Ponies and the Syracuse Mets, batting .251 with three home runs and 18 RBIs over 62 games. He returned to Syracuse to open the 2022 season.

Cal Poly bio

Dedniel Núñez

Dedniel Omar Núñez (born June 5, 1996) is a Dominican professional baseball pitcher for the New York Mets of Major League Baseball.

Núñez signed with the New York Mets as an international free agent in October 2016. He played in Minor League Baseball in the Mets organization from 2017 through 2019. In 2019 between Class A and Class A+, he was 5-4 with a 4.39 ERA, and 94 strikeouts in 80 innings.

The Giants selected Núñez from the Mets in the 2020 Rule 5 draft. On March 15, 2021, it was announced that Núñez had sprained the ulnar collateral ligament in his pitching elbow. On March 18, Núñez was placed on the 60-day injured list after undergoing Tommy John surgery, causing him to miss the 2021 season.

On November 19, 2021, the Giants returned Núñez to the Mets.

Eric Orze

Eric Paul Orze (born August 21, 1997) is an American professional baseball pitcher in the New York Mets organization.

Orze attended Glenbard North High School in Carol Stream, Illinois and played college baseball at the University of New Orleans. While at New Orleans, he was diagnosed with  testicular cancer and skin cancer.

Orze was drafted by the New York Mets in the fifth round of the 2020 Major League Baseball draft. He made his professional debut in 2021 with the Brooklyn Cyclones and was promoted to the Binghamton Rumble Ponies and Syracuse Mets during the season. Over 34 relief appearances between the three teams, Orze went 4-2 with a 3.08 ERA and 67 strikeouts over  innings.

Alex Ramírez

Alexander Ramírez (born January 13, 2003) is a Dominican professional baseball outfielder in the New York Mets organization.

Ramírez signed with the New York Mets as an international free agent in July 2019. He made his professional debut in 2021 with the St. Lucie Mets. He hit .258/.326/.384 with five home runs and 35 runs batted in (RBI) over 76 games.

Ramírez started 2022 with St. Lucie and was promoted to the Brooklyn Cyclones in July.

Mike Vasil

Michael Vasil (born March 19, 2000) is an American professional baseball pitcher in the New York Mets organization.

Vasil attended Boston College High School in Boston, Massachusetts. He was expected to be a high draft pick in the 2018 Major League Baseball Draft but withdrew his name from the draft and opted to play college baseball at the University of Virginia. In 2019, he played collegiate summer baseball with the Orleans Firebirds of the Cape Cod Baseball League. After three years at Virginia, Vasil was drafted by the New York Mets in the eighth round of the 2021 Major League Baseball draft.

Vasil made his professional debut in 2021 with the Florida Complex League Mets. He started 2022 with the St. Lucie Mets before being promoted to the Brooklyn Cyclones.

Josh Walker

Joshua Todd Walker (born December 1, 1994) is an American professional baseball pitcher in the New York Mets organization.

Walker attended Minisink Valley High School in Slate Hill, New York, where he played football, baseball, and swam. As a senior, he had a 2.60 ERA. After high school, he played college baseball for two seasons at the University of South Florida before transferring to the University of New Haven in 2016. In 2017, his senior season at New Haven, he had a 3-1 record and a 2.40 ERA over thirty innings.

After the season, Walker was selected by the New York Mets in the 37th round of the 2017 Major League Baseball draft. He signed and made his professional debut with the Rookie-level Gulf Coast League Mets where he posted a 9.42 ERA over  innings. In 2018, he played with the Kingsport Mets of the Rookie-level Appalachian League before being promoted to the Brooklyn Cyclones of the Class A Short Season New York–Penn League, pitching to a 3.27 ERA with 52 strikeouts over  innings. Walker pitched only six innings in 2019 after being in a car accident that injured his left arm, and he did not play a game in 2020 after the minor league season was cancelled due to the COVID-19 pandemic. To begin the 2021 season, he was assigned to Brooklyn (now members of the High-A East) and was promoted to the Binghamton Rumble Ponies of the Double-A Northeast and the Syracuse Mets of the Triple-A East during the season. Over 21 games (twenty starts) between the three clubs, Walker pitched to a 9-4 record, a 3.73 ERA, and 98 strikeouts over  innings. He returned to Syracuse to begin the 2022 season on the injured list. He made rehab appearances with the Florida Complex League Mets and the St. Lucie Mets before he was assigned to Syracuse; over 22 innings pitched for the season between the three teams, he went 3-2 with a 4.91 ERA and 38 strikeouts.

Calvin Ziegler

Calvin William Ziegler (born October 3, 2002) is a Canadian professional baseball pitcher in the New York Mets organization.

Ziegler was born in Canada and attended TNXL Academy in Ocoee, Florida his senior year due to Canadian travel restrictions because of the COVID-19 pandemic. He was drafted by the New York Mets in the second round of the 2021 Major League Baseball draft.

Ziegler made his professional debut in 2022 with the St. Lucie Mets.

Full Triple-A to Rookie League rosters

Triple-A

Double-A

High-A

Single-A

Rookie

Foreign Rookie

References

Minor league players
Lists of minor league baseball players